Vestre Slidre is a municipality in Innlandet county, Norway. It is located in the traditional district of Valdres. The administrative centre of the municipality is the village of Slidre. Other villages in Vestre Slidre include Lomen and Røn.

The  municipality is the 219th largest by area out of the 356 municipalities in Norway. Vestre Slidre is the 275th most populous municipality in Norway with a population of 2,111.

General information 

The municipality of Vestre Slidre was established in 1849 when the old municipality of Slidre was divided into two municipalities: Vestre Slidre (population: 3,130) and Øystre Slidre (population: 2,406). On 1 January 1899, a small unpopulated part of Øystre Slidre was transferred to Vestre Slidre. On 1 January 2021, the Skjelgrenda area of Vestre Slidre was transferred to Øystre Slidre.

Name 
The municipality (originally the parish) is named after the old Slidre farm, since the first church (Slidredomen) was built here. The name is probably derived from slíðr which means "sheath" (which is probably referring to a long depression near the church). In 1849, the municipality and parish was divided into two and the word Vestre was added to the beginning of the name. Vestre means "western", so the meaning of the name Vestre Slidre is "(the) western (part of) Slidre".

Coat of arms 
The coat of arms was granted on 20 November 1987. The blue and white/silver arms are based on a heraldic decoration found in the local Slidredomen church that dates back to the year 1170. The design was originally part of a seal that belonged to a medieval nobleman from the area. The meaning of the design is unknown.

Churches
The Church of Norway has three parishes within the municipality of Vestre Slidre. It is part of the Valdres prosti (deanery) in the Diocese of Hamar.

 The ruins of Mo church (Mo kirkeruin) are located on the west side of the Slidrefjorden. The medieval church of stone was built ca. 1215 and was probably out of use after the Reformation. The ruins were excavated and restored from 1972–1977.
 Slidredomen, a medieval stone-built church, was once the main church for Valdres. The church is built around 1170. The church is entirely made of stone. Its treasures formerly included a chalice presented by Bishop Salomon of Oslo (1322–1352), the only Bishop in Norway to survive the Black Death. Slidredomen is also known to have had a local bishop.
 Lomen Stave Church is located in the small village of Lomen. It was built circa 1170. The exterior of the present Lomen church is post-Reformation, and only the wall and roof timbers remain from the original building.

History 

High above the village of Slidre, there is an ancient burial ground called the Gardberg site. At this site, there is a runestone which reads I Godguest wrote the runes. This stone is known as the Einang stone.

Vestre Sildre figures prominently in the Norse Sagas:
According to the Sagas, Harald Fairhair was the first Norwegian king (872–930) of Norway. In 866, he made the first of a series of conquests over a number of petty kingdoms. One of the encounters leading to the overall conquest was with Skallagrim Kveldulvssøn in Vestre Slidre. In 872, after winning the Battle of Hafrsfjord near Stavanger, he found himself king of the whole country.
 In the Heimskringla attributed to Snorri Sturluson, it is recorded that in 1023 King Olav came unannounced from Sogn as part of his campaign to Christianize Norway. At Slidre, he caught the peasants unaware and secured all their boats. As a condition for having their boats restored, they accepted Christianity.

Government
All municipalities in Norway, including Vestre Slidre, are responsible for primary education (through 10th grade), outpatient health services, senior citizen services, unemployment and other social services, zoning, economic development, and municipal roads.  The municipality is governed by a municipal council of elected representatives, which in turn elects a mayor.  The municipality falls under the Vestre Innlandet District Court and the Eidsivating Court of Appeal.

Municipal council
The municipal council  of Vestre Slidre is made up of 17 representatives that are elected to four year terms.  The party breakdown of the council is as follows:

Mayors
The mayors of Vestre Slidre (incomplete list):

1945-1947: Endre Fyrstro (V)
1948-1951: Ola J. Dahle (Sp)
1952-1955: Erik Steine Riste (Sp)
1956-1963: Erik Kirkeeng (V)
1964-1967: Erik Steine Riste (Sp)
1968-1979: Ola Ødegård (Sp)
1980–1999: Sverre Vik (Sp)
1999-2011: Eivind Brenna (BL)
2011-2015: Lars Kvissel (Sp) 
2015–2019: Eivind Brenna (V)
2019–present: Haldor Ødegård (Sp)

Geography 

Vestre Slidre is bordered to the northwest by Vang Municipality, to the northeast by Øystre Slidre Municipality, to the east by Nord-Aurdal Municipality, and to the southwest by Hemsedal Municipality (in Viken county). Vestre Slidre is part of the Valdres region in south-central Norway. It is situated between Gudbrandsdal and Hallingdal.

The municipality is located along the river Begna and its surrounding valley. There are several lakes in the municipalities including Helin, Øyangen, Slidrefjorden, and Strondafjorden.

Notable residents 
 Ole Brandt (1818–1880), a Norwegian farmer and Mayor of Vestre Slidre 1850s and 1860s.
 Ragnhild Kåta (1873–1947), the first deafblind Norwegian to receive proper schooling
 Ola Bøe (1910–1986), a Norwegian fiddler 
 Knut Hauge (1911–1999), an author of novels, children's books, and plays
 Berit Skjefte (1809–1899), langeleik player

References

External links 

Municipal fact sheet from Statistics Norway 

 
Valdres
Municipalities of Innlandet
1849 establishments in Norway